Aesthetic illusion is a type of mental absorption which describes a generally pleasurable cognitive state that is frequently triggered by various media or other artifacts. Recipients can be drawn into a represented world imaginatively, emotionally or, to some extent, rationally and experience the world, the characters and the story in a lifelike way. The emergence of aesthetic illusion depends heavily on an authored vision provided by a (media) artifact. Thus, different recipients can be expected to share similar imaginative experiences, which stands in contrast to more recipient-centered illusionist experiences like hallucinations, dreams, daydreams and delusions. Aesthetic illusion (immersion) is always counterbalanced by a rational awareness of the recipient of the difference between the "real" and the "imagined". In other words, aesthetic illusion is a double-layered phenomenon in which recipients constantly fluctuate between their "virtual" body on the level of immersion (primarily imaginatively and emotionally) and their "real" body on the level of rational awareness and distancing effect.

Illusionist media or artifacts can either be
 fictional (e.g. the Harry Potter series) or factual (e.g. historiographic narratives, travelogues)
 aesthetic (i.e. widely considered "works of art") or non-aesthetic (e.g. works in popular culture, new media and artifacts that would not (yet) readily be called art)
 narrative (i.e. telling a story) or descriptive (e.g. many landscape paintings or still lifes).

History of the term and the concept 
The term illusion derives from the Latin word illudere ("to mock", "to deceive"; from in- [against] and ludere [to play]) and alludes to a certain playfulness and the willing participation in a game on the part of the recipient. Kendall Walton speaks in this context of illusion as a game of make-believe. Aesthetic derives from the Ancient Greek αἰσθητικός ("of sense perception"). In the context of aesthetic illusion, aesthetic does not refer to a specific or high aesthetic quality of an artifact; instead, it refers to the etymological meaning of "sensory" as well as to an aesthetic effect, i.e. to a specific imaginative reaction of the recipients which is triggered by an artifact.

The term aesthetic illusion is primarily, though not consistently, used in the academic fields of literature and the visual arts. Other terms used in these fields to describe the same or a similar phenomenon include absorption (Nell 1988), make-believe, recentering (Ryan 1991) and immersion (e.g. Ryan 2015). Academic literature in other fields, such as film studies, game studies, or psychology, tends to prefer other terms—immersion in particular (e.g. Ermi & Märyä, 2005; Thon, 2008).

Especially the realm of (digital) technology appears to be driven by a desire to achieve a higher degree of aesthetic illusion (cf. Wolf, 2014, Chapter 3.5), where terms such as immersion, immersive, absorbing, addicting and addictive are frequently used to describe a state of high mental or sensory absorption. The usage of these terms, however, runs the risk of promoting a one-sided or incomplete view of aesthetic illusion whenever no references are made to the opposite pole of rational awareness (distance) or when the sole focus is on (hyper-)realistic (re)presentation. These alternative terms may even point to different phenomena like flow or (tele‑)presence altogether.

The first known occurrence of the concept of aesthetic illusion was traced back by Ernst Gombrich (1960) to the visual arts of the period between the 6th and 4th century B.C. Some scholars, however, find first traces in even older works such as Homer's epics. Later, both Plato and Aristotle argued over the value of mimesis in the sense of the representation of nature (which is an important part of aesthetic illusion).

Discussing Shakespeare’s tragedy Anthony and Cleopatra, Samuel Johnson alluded to the concept in his preface to his 1765 edition of collected plays of Shakespeare:He that can take the stage at one time for the palace of the Ptolemies, may take it in half an hour for the promontory of Actium. Delusion, if delusion be admitted, has no certain limitation; if the spectator can be once persuaded, that his old acquaintance are Alexander and Cæsar, that a room illuminated with candles is the plain of Pharsalia, or the bank of Granicus, he is in a state of elevation above the reach of reason, or of truth, and from the heights of empyrean poetry, may despise the circumscriptions of terrestrial nature. There is no reason why a mind thus wandering in extacy should count the clock, or why an hour should not be a century in that calenture of the brains that can make the stage a field.The truth is, that the spectators are always in their senses, and know, from the first act to the last, that the stage is only a stage, and that the players are only players. They came to hear a certain number of lines recited with just gesture and elegant modulation. The lines relate to some action, and an action must be in some place; but the different actions that complete a story may be in places very remote from each other; and where is the absurdity of allowing that space to represent first Athens, and then Sicily, which was always known to be neither Sicily nor Athens, but a modern theatre?Kant speaks of a similar phenomenon when he discusses his transcendental illusion in his Kritik der reinen Vernunft (Critique of Pure Reason) (cf. McFarland 1990, p. 346f.). In 1817, Samuel Taylor Coleridge famously defined aesthetic illusion as the "willing suspension of disbelief".

More recently, the concept has been revisited and examined by several academics, including philosopher Kendall Walton in his make-believe theory, literary scholar Marie-Laure Ryan in a number of articles and books (e.g. 1991, 2015), Emeritus Professor of Psychology Victor Nell (1988) and numerous scholars in the field of game studies, though usually with a strong emphasis on immersion (see Cairns, Cox, & Nordin, 2014 for a review on research on immersion in video games). English literature professor Werner Wolf developed a comprehensive theory of aesthetic illusion and provides a definition that encompasses various media, genres and modes of reception (cf. 2013, 2014).

References 

Illusions